Saul Becker  (born 20 April 1960) is a British academic and social scientist renowned for his work on Young carers and considered as the world leader in the field. He is author of Young Carers and their families. He is currently the deputy Vice-Chancellor of the University of Sussex, UK.

Early life and education
Becker is a graduate of Rossall School. In addition to being a fellow of the Academy of Social Sciences he holds a BA, MA, CQSW, PhD, RSW and FRSA.

Career
As of May 2022 Becker is a Professor in the Faculty of Health & Education at Manchester Metropolitan University.

Becker previously held chairs at the universities of Birmingham, Loughborough and Nottingham. He was pro-vice-chancellor at the University of Birmingham from 2014 till 2017. He is an academician and Fellow of the UK's Academy of Social Sciences and a Fellow of the Royal Society of Arts.

Becker is known as highly funded researcher and academic, spending £500k in research awards during the academic year 2015/16.

Becker is a registered social worker.

Publications
Becker is a prolific author with over 330 publications (including 18 books) and over 210 conference papers, most as invited keynote speaker.

He is also the chair of the UK Social Policy Association and the founding series editor for the Policy Press Understanding Welfare book series.

References

Academics of the University of Nottingham
Living people
1960 births
British social scientists
Academics of the University of Sussex